Huot may refer to:

Huot, Minnesota, an historic river crossing and site in Northwest Minnesota, now a ghost town
Old Crossing Treaty Park, a county park in Red Lake County, Minnesota
Huot automatic rifle, a Canadian automatic weapons program

People
Benoit Huot (born 1984), Canadian Paralympic swimmer
Chhor Leang Huot, Cambodian politician
François Huot (1756–1822), Canadian businessman and political figure
Hector-Simon Huot (1803–1846), Canadian lawyer and politician
Hong Sun Huot, Cambodian Minister of Health and Chairman of the National AIDS Authority
Isabelle Huot, Canadian nutritionist and professional dietitian
Jean Jacques Nicolas Huot (1790—1845), French geographer, geologist and naturalist
Jessica Huot (born 1983), Finnish figure skater
Joseph Oliva Huot (1917–1983), American politician
Marcel Huot (1896—1954), French professional road bicycle racer
Marie Huot (1846–1930), French poet, writer, feminist and animal rights activist
Marie-Catherine Huot (1791–1869), Canadian mother superior
Patrick Huot, Canadian politician
Pierre-Gabriel Huot (1825–1913), Quebec journalist and political figure
Sylvia Huot, English professor and author
Try Chheang Huot, Cambodian politician
Ung Huot (born 1947), Cambodian political figure